Glochidion gardneri is a species of plant in the family Phyllanthaceae. It is endemic to Sri Lanka.

References
 http://www.theplantlist.org/tpl/record/kew-90451
 http://arctos.database.museum/name/Glochidion%20gardneri
 http://www.catalogueoflife.org/col/details/species/id/9814864/synonym/10049141
 https://www.gbif.org/species/3080656/

gardneri
Endemic flora of Sri Lanka
Vulnerable flora of Asia